The U.S. FAA lists factors of aircraft upset in the Airplane Upset Recovery Training Aid as follows:

 Turbulence causes:
 Clear air turbulence
 Mountain wave turbulence
 Windshear
 Thunderstorms
 Microbursts
 Wake turbulence
 Aircraft icing
 Systems anomalies:
 Flight instruments
 Autoflight systems
 Flight control and other anomalies
 Pilot-Induced
 Instrument cross-check
 Adjusting attitude and power
 Inattention
 Distraction from primary cockpit duties
 Vertigo or spatial disorientation
 Pilot incapacitation
 Improper use of airplane automation
 Pilot techniques
 Pilot induced oscillation avoidance and recovery
 Combination causes:
 Swept-wing airplane fundamentals for pilots
 Flight dynamics
 Energy states
 Load factor (flight mechanics)
 Aerodynamic flight envelope
 Aerodynamic causes:
 Angle of attack and stall
 Camber
 Control surface fundamentals
 Spoiler-type devices
 Trim
 Lateral and directional aerodynamic considerations
 Angle of sideslip
 Wing dihedral effects
 Pilot-commanded sideslip
 Crossover speed
 Static stability
 Maneuvering in pitch
 Mechanics of turning flight
 Lateral and directional maneuvering
 Flight at extremely low airspeeds
 High-altitude factors
 Stall
 icing
 Automation during high-altitude flight
 Primary flight display airspeed indications
 Human factors and high altitude upsets
 Additional considerations:
 Multi-engine flame out
 Core lock
 Engine rollback
 Flight at extremely high speeds
 Defensive, aggressive maneuvers
 Situation awareness
 Startle factor
 Negative G-force
 Use of full control inputs
 Counter-intuitive factors
 Previous training in non-similar airplanes
 Engine performance in upset situation
 Post-upset conditions

See also 

 Aircraft upset

References 

Aviation risks